Hymenostegia aubrevillei is a medium-sized tree in the family Fabaceae found in riparian habitats. It is endemic to Côte d'Ivoire, Ghana (in the Krokosua Hills and across the Dahomey Gap), and Nigeria.
It is threatened by habitat loss by the deforestation, mining and agriculture, as well as fires.

References

Detarioideae
Plants described in 1933
Flora of Ivory Coast
Flora of Ghana
Flora of Nigeria
Vulnerable plants
Taxonomy articles created by Polbot
Taxa named by François Pellegrin